U-Men is the first EP by the band The U-Men released in 1984.

The song "Gila" appears on a split with the Melvins for Sugar Daddy Live.

Track listing 

 Blight - 2:33
 Flowers D.G.I.H. - 4:17
 Shoot 'Em Down - 4:00
 Gila - 2:18

References

1984 debut EPs
The U-Men albums